Charles Goerens (born 6 February 1952) is a Luxembourgish politician and Member of the European Parliament (MEP) from Luxembourg. He is a member of the Democratic Party, part of the Alliance of Liberals and Democrats for Europe.

Early career
He studied agricultural science before he was first elected to the northern district constituency as a member of the Democratic Party in 1979. From 1989 until 1994 he was its chairman.

Political career
Goerens was a member of the European Parliament from 1982 to 1984, from 1994 to 1999, and again from 2009 to present.

He served as Minister for Cooperation, Humanitarian Action, and Defence in the government of Jean-Claude Juncker from 7 August 1999 until 31 July 2004. He also briefly served as Minister for Foreign Affairs from 20 July 2004 until 31 July 2004. He lost these posts when Juncker had to form a new coalition government after the 2004 parliamentary elections.

Since 2009, Goerens has been serving as a member of the Committee on Development and of the Subcommittee on Human Rights. Following the 2019 European Parliament election, he also became a vice-chair of the Committee on Constitutional Affairs. 

In addition to his committee assignments, Goerens is a member of the European Parliament Intergroup on Extreme Poverty and Human Rights, the MEPs Against Cancer group (since 2019). and the Responsible Business Conduct Working Group. He also co-chairs the cross-party Working Group on Fair Trade (sponsored by Fair Trade Advocacy).

Other activities
 Friends of the Global Fund, Vice-Chair of the Board
 Fondation pour la construction de l'avenir du Luxembourg (FOCAL), Member of the Board

References

External links 

 ALDE-Fraktion im Europaparliament:Charles Goerens
 Europäisches Parliament:Charles Goerens
  Luxemburg: interview with Goerens as defence minister " "Die Lage ist ruhig, aber fragil". Der Verteidigungsminister über die Lage im Kosovo (german)

|-

|-

|-

1952 births
Living people
People from Ettelbruck
Ministers for Defence of Luxembourg
Ministers for the Environment of Luxembourg
Ministers for Foreign Affairs of Luxembourg
Members of the Chamber of Deputies (Luxembourg)
Members of the Chamber of Deputies (Luxembourg) from Nord
Democratic Party (Luxembourg) politicians
Democratic Party (Luxembourg) MEPs
MEPs for Luxembourg 1994–1999
MEPs for Luxembourg 2009–2014
MEPs for Luxembourg 2014–2019
MEPs for Luxembourg 2019–2024